Andrew Cox (born 25 January 1956) is a British guitarist, who along with Dave Wakeling, formed ska band the Beat in 1978.

The Beat achieved eight Top 40 singles and three hit albums in the UK before announcing their break up in 1983. Some of their notable hits included "Mirror in the Bathroom", "Hands Off...She's Mine" and "Can't Get Used to Losing You".

In 1985 he joined fellow Beat member David Steele and singer Roland Gift, to form pop rock band Fine Young Cannibals.

In 1988, while Fine Young Cannibals were on hiatus, Cox and Steele released the instrumental house music single, "Tired of Getting Pushed Around", under the name of Two Men, A Drum Machine and A Trumpet. It reached No. 18 in the UK Singles Chart. That same year, they also collaborated with Wee Papa Girl Rappers debut single "Heat It Up" which peaked at No. 21. 

In 2002, Cox formed Cribabi with Japanese vocalist, Yukari Fujiu, and released the album Volume on his own Fidela record label.

References

External links
 
 
 

1956 births
Living people
English new wave musicians
English rock guitarists
The Beat (British band) members
Fine Young Cannibals members
Musicians from Birmingham, West Midlands
British ska musicians